This is a timeline of the broadcasting of schools programmes on television in the UK.

1950s 
 1957
 13 May – The very first UK broadcast of a television programme for schools takes place. It is transmitted by London's ITV contractor Associated-Rediffusion.
 24 September – The BBC broadcasts its first programmes for schools.

 1958
 No events.

 1959
 No events.

1960s 
 1960
19 September – BBC Schools starts using the Pie Chart ident to coincide with the first morning broadcasts, which are branded as For the Schools.

 1961
 No events.

 1962
 No events.

 1963
 No events.

 1964
 No events.

 1965
 BBC Schools programmes are now branded as For Schools and Colleges.

 1966
 No events.

 1967
 No events.

 1968
 No events.

 1969
 No events.

1970s 
 1970
 ITV Schools programmes start being broadcast in colour.

 1971
 No events.

 1972
 September – Following a law change which removed all restrictions on broadcasting hours, ITV is able to launch an afternoon service and ITV Schools transfers to a new morning slot with programmes shown between 9:30am and midday.

 1973
 No events.

 1974
 23 September – The presentation of BBC Schools changes with the introduction of the blue diamond on a black background with the BBC1 legend. It is commissioned to mark the start of BBC schools programmes being broadcast in colour.

 1975
 No events.

 1976
 No events.

 1977
 19 September – The presentation of BBC Schools changes with the introduction of the countdown clock of disappearing dots around a spinning 'Schools and Colleges' legend. Special holding captions with the phrase 'Follows Shortly' were beginning to be used for junctions longer than the 60 seconds that the ident required.

 1978
 No events.

 1979
 No events.

1980s 
 1980
 No events.

 1981
 No events.

 1982
 January – A computerised version of the BBC schools clock is brought into service, replacing the mechanical device used since 1977.
 April-June – The Falklands War sees schools programmes sometimes being shown on BBC2 to allow BBC1 to provide coverage of the latest developments. A hastily added BBC2 Schools ident was used, with the replaced caption being the orange logo on a black background box.

 1983
24 June – BBC Schools programmes are broadcast as For Schools, Colleges, and on BBC1, for the final time ahead of their move to BBC2 in the autumn.
 19 September – Programmes for schools and colleges are transferred to BBC2 and an all-day educational strand called Daytime on Two is launched along with a special sequence of Ceefax pages called the Daytime on Two information Service which is broadcast during the longer gaps between programmes. A special version of the striped 2 ident is created, featuring an orange background instead of the usual black. Clocks were not used alongside the look but the 'Follows Shortly' captions were retained.

 1984
 No events.

 1985
 28 June – The end of the 1984/85 school year sees the closure of the Daytime on Two information service and when Daytime on Two returns in September, all gaps of 10 minutes or less are filled by interval captions using the 'Follows Shortly' captions over music, before cutting to the ident and announcement. Breaks of more than 10 minutes are filled with the usual Ceefax miscellenary.

 1986
 21 March – At 2.30pm, the special version of the striped 2 ident is shown for the final time.
 21 April – Following the rebranding of BBC2 and the launch of the white embossed TWO, no special ident is used to introduce Daytime on Two programmes although a later addition is a 15-second countdown timer, displaying the seconds in a box, usually located in the top right corner of the screen.
 22 September – From the start of the 1986–87 school year, Daytime on Two ends slightly earlier, at 2.15pm or 2.35pm instead of 3pm.
 8 December – Six weeks after launching its daytime service, BBC TV starts broadcasting hourly news summaries. Consequently, a news bulletin at 2pm becomes part of Daytime on Two.

 1987
 29 June – Schools programmes are broadcast on ITV for the final time. 
 14 September – ITV Schools transfers to Channel 4 and S4C. The programmes are shown at the same time as they were broadcast on ITV i.e between 9:30am and 12pm. Just two pieces of interval music are used, The Journey for a 3D holding device and Just a Minute which backed a redesigned clock.

 1988
 No events.

 1989
 No events.

1990s 
 1990
 Summer term – For the first time, there are no programme breaks during the summer term's Daytime on Two output with programmes shown non-stop between 9am and 2.15pm.

 1991
 February – Following the rebrand of TWO to BBC2, including the introduction of the '2' idents, no special presentation is used to mark schools programmes. The 'Follows Shortly' captions are phased out in place of promotions of other appropriate programmes.

 1992
 June – ITV Schools opt-outs in the Grampian Television, Scottish Television and Border Television and Ulster Television (UTV) regions are broadcast for the final time, ahead of Channel 4 being spun off from IBA control. S4C in Wales continues to opt out of some English programmes for its Welsh-language programmes.

 1993
 19 January – Schools programmes are shown overnight on BBC2 for the first time as part of a new experiment called Night School. The broadcasts are generally either subject blocks or series blocks.
 28 June – The final ITV Schools programmes are shown.
 20 September – Schools programmes continue to be shown on Channel 4 under the branding of Channel 4 Schools, along with new idents. and on S4C, schools programming is branded as S4C Ysgollon.

 1994
 No events.

 1995
 9 October – BBC Learning Zone is launched and the output includes schools programming aimed at secondary school pupils. Primary schools programming continues to be shown during the morning.

 1996
 No events.

 1997
 June – BBC Schools programmes are broadcast under the Daytime on Two brand for the final time.
 September – Schools programmes on the BBC are now branded under the title of School Programmes with broadcasts limited to the morning hours.

 1998
 BBC Bitesize is launched as a free online study support resource for school-age pupils in the United Kingdom to aid pupils in both schoolwork and for older pupils, exams.

 1999
 1 June – BBC Knowledge launches as part of the BBC's move into digital television. The new channel broadcasts a mix of educational and informative programming, aimed at both adults and children. Original programme included a GCSE survival guide and technology series The Kit, aimed at getting children online and embracing digital.
 Autumn – Secondary school programming is moved permanently to overnight transmission and is aired as part of the BBC Learning Zone. Programmes aimed at primary school children continue to be shown during the day.

2000s 
 2000
 April – Channel 4 rebrands its schools programming as 4Learning.

 2001
 No events.

 2002
 11 February – The new CBBC channel launches and it broadcasts schools programmes during the day as part of their remit to show schools programming. They are broadcast as a strand called  Class TV, shown during schools hours for a few hours (usually repeats of previous programmes, rather than new ones).
 2 March – BBC Knowledge closes.

 2003
 No events.

 2004
 No events.

2005
 After 18 years, Channel 4 ends its packaged schools television service.

 2006
 No events.

 2007  
 No events.

 2008
 20 March – The remit of CBBC is altered to remove the schools programming element from the channel.

 2009
 Schools programmes are broadcast on Channel 4 for the final time.

2010s
2010
 26 March – Primary school programming is shown on BBC Two for the final time.

2011
 No events.

2012
 No events.

2013
 No events.

2014
 No events.

2015
 24 July – BBC Learning Zone ends "due to budget cuts". This sees the end of the transmission of schools programmes on the BBC after 58 years as from this date, all schools programming moves online.

2016
 No events.

2017
 No events.

2018
 No events.

2019
 December – CBBC brings back Class TV with 'Live Lessons' presented by the CBBC presenting team on late weekday mornings.

2020s
 2020
 20 April – With the onset of the COVID-19 pandemic and the first national lockdown in England, the BBC begins offering daily educational programming to help children with schoolwork at home. It is described as the biggest education push "in its history".

 2021
 11 January – The COVID-19 pandemic in the United Kingdom and the closure of schools around the country during the first and third national lockdowns sees CBBC and BBC Two broadcast shows from the BBC Bitesize service for primary-school-aged children. These shows feature a mix of archive, live and newly filmed content.

 2022
 No events.

References

Schools Broadcasts in the UK
Schools Broadcasts in the UK
Educational broadcasting in the United Kingdom
Schools Broadcasts in the UK
Schools Broadcasts in the UK
Schools Broadcasts in the UK